Lycée Franco-Qatarien Voltaire is a French international school in West Bay, Doha, Qatar, in proximity to the Institut français du Qatar and the University of Qatar. As of 2015 it has 518 students.

The school was established on 15 January 2008. It originated from an international convention agreed upon between the French and Qatari governments on 3 May 2007, which stipulates the establishment of the school. Nicolas Sarkozy and Tamim Bin Hamad Al Thani attended the inauguration.

References

External links

  Lycée Franco-Qatarien Voltaire
  Lycée Franco-Qatarien Voltaire

Doha
Schools in Doha
Educational institutions established in 2008
2008 establishments in Qatar